Do Khiladi is a 1976 Bollywood action drama film directed by Jugal Kishore. The film stars Vinod Mehra and Anita Guha.

Cast
 Vinod Mehra
 Zahira
 Jayshree T.
 Anita Guha
 Indrani Mukherjee
 Paintal
 Jani Babu

Music
"Rat Abhee Bakee Hai" - Jaani Babu Qawwal
"Jhumta Savan Dekho Aaya, Barkha Ne Pyar Barsaya" - Mohammed Rafi
"Dosto Kya Kahe Hum Tumse" - Asha Bhosle
"Meri Bhi Koi Behna Hoti" - Kishore Kumar
"Tu Sat Kamro Me Band Padi Ho" - Amit Kumar

References

External links
 

1976 films
Films scored by Usha Khanna
1970s Hindi-language films
Indian action drama films